Kulakkattakurichi is a panchayat Village in Tirunelveli district in the Indian state of Tamil Nadu.  This village is under the control of  Kuruvikulam block Sankarankoil taluk

References 

Villages in Tirunelveli district